The Peak Range is a small subrange of the Swannell Ranges of the Omineca Mountains, located on the northwest side of the junction of Toodoggone River and Finlay River in northern British Columbia, Canada.

There is also a Peak Range in Central Queensland.

References

Peak Range in the Canadian Mountain Encyclopedia

Swannell Ranges